Sudangsu Abinash "Montu" Banerjee  (1 November 1919 – 14 September 1992) was an Indian cricketer who played in one Test match in 1948 against West Indies.

See also
One Test Wonder

References

External links

1919 births
1992 deaths
India Test cricketers
Indian cricketers
East Zone cricketers
Bengal cricketers
Cricketers from Kolkata
University of Calcutta alumni